Motley County High School or Motley County School is a 1A public high school located in Matador, Texas (USA). It is part of the Motley County Independent School District located in central Motley County.

In 2019, the school was given an Accountability Rating of 'A' by the Texas Education Agency with distinction designations in ELA/Reading, Social Studies, Comparative Academic Growth, Postsecondary Readiness, and Comparative Closing the Gaps.

Athletics
The Motley County Matadors compete in the following sports:

Basketball
Cross Country
6-Man Football
Golf
Tennis

State titles
Football
2007(6M/D2)

State finalists
Football
2011(6M/D2)
2019(6M/D2)
2021(6M/D2)

References

External links
Motley County ISD
List of Six-man football stadiums in Texas

Public high schools in Texas
Public middle schools in Texas
Public elementary schools in Texas